Good Girl? (乖女仔) is Sherman Chung's debut album, published by Music Plus.

Good Girl? - Version 1

CD

乖女仔 (Miss Goodie)
街頭女皇 (The Street Queen)
高手過招 (Throes of Masters)
Let's Pop
Call Me
愛味 (Taste of Love)
人魚前傳 (The Mermaid's Story)
舒曼的狂想曲 (Schumann's Wild Theme Songs))
好好擁抱 (Good Embrace)
得一個 (Only One)
數綿羊 (Count Sheep)

DVD

高手過招 MV (Throes of Masters (Music Video))
好好擁抱 MV (Good Embrace (Music Video))
Let's Pop (Music Video)

Good Girl? - Version 2

CD

乖女仔 (Miss Goodie)
街頭女皇 (The Street Queen)
高手過招 (Throes of Masters)
Let's Pop
Call Me
愛味 (Taste of Love)
人魚前傳 (The Mermaid's Story)
舒曼的狂想曲 (Schumann's Wild Theme Songs))
好好擁抱 (Good Embrace)
得一個 (Only One)
數綿羊 (Count Sheep)

DVD

高手過招 MV (Throes of Masters (Music Video))
好好擁抱 MV (Good Embrace (Music Video))
Let's Pop (Music Video)
Sherman Live in Showcase- 高手過招/ Let's Pop/ Say You Love Me/ 好好擁抱 (Throes of Masters/ Let's Pop/ Say You Love Me/ Good Embrace)

References

Sherman Chung albums
2007 debut albums